Thaleia nisonis is a species of minute, ectoparasitic sea snail, a marine gastropod mollusk or micromollusk in the family Eulimidae.

Distribution
T. nisonis can be found in Atlantic waters, ranging from South Carolina to Brazil.

Description 
The maximum recorded shell length is 9 mm.

Habitat 
Minimum recorded depth is 50 m. Maximum recorded depth is 1930 m.

References

 Rosenberg, G., F. Moretzsohn, and E. F. García. 2009. Gastropoda (Mollusca) of the Gulf of Mexico, Pp. 579–699 in Felder, D.L. and D.K. Camp (eds.), Gulf of Mexico–Origins, Waters, and Biota. Biodiversity. Texas A&M Press, College Station, Texas.

External links

Eulimidae
Gastropods described in 1889